Philipsburg is a borough in Centre County, Pennsylvania. It is located at  (40.895, -78.2193). It is part of the State College, Pennsylvania metropolitan statistical area. The borough's population was 2,770 at the 2010 census.

Geography
According to the U.S. Census Bureau, the borough has a total area of 0.8 square mile (2.1 km2), all  land.  Major roads which pass through the area are U.S. Route 322 and PA Routes 53, 350, and 504.

Historical landmarks
Philipsburg is home to a number of sites of renovated historical interest, including the Rowland Theater (located on Front Street), the Union Church and Burial Ground, also known as the "Mud" Church, on Presqueisle Street, the Simler House (on North Second St), and the Hardman Philips House, located off Presqueisle Street near Ninth Street, thought to be a stop on the Underground Railroad. The Rowland Mansion on South Centre Street is the former home of U.S. Congressman Charles Hedding Rowland. The Philipsburg commercial district underwent a series of renovations including a $1 million street project to revitalize the main shopping district.

The Philipsburg Historic District was added to the National Register of Historic Places in 1999.

Demographics

As of the 2010 census, there were 2,770 people, 1,317 households, and 686 families residing in the borough.  The population density was 3,462.5 people per square mile (1,319.0/km2).  There were 1,512 housing units at an average density of 1,890/sq mi (720/km2).  The racial makeup of the borough was 94.5% White,1.6% Black or African American, 0.2% Native American, 2.8% Asian, 0.3% from other races, and 1.0% from two or more races. Hispanic or Latino of any race were 1.1% of the population.

There were 1,317 households, out of which 23.2% had children under the age of 18 living with them, 38.0% were married couples living together, 3.6% had a male householder with no wife present, 10.5% had a female householder with no husband present, and 47.9% were non-families. 40.4% of all households were made up of individuals, and 18.7% had someone living alone who was 65 years of age or older.  The average household size was 2.10 and the average family size was 2.86.

In the borough, the population was spread out, with 19.3% under the age of 18, 9.6% from 18 to 24, 25.8% from 25 to 44, 24.8% from 45 to 64, and 20.5% who were 65 years of age or older.  The median age was 42 years. For every 100 females, there were 89.2 males.  For every 100 females age 18 and over, there were 87.7 males.

The median income for a household in the borough was $31,903, and the median income for a family was $42,433.  The per capita income for the borough was $23,675.  16.8% of the population and 11.0% of families were below the poverty line.  Out of the total people living in poverty, 14.8% are under the age of 18 and 8.6% are 65 or older.

Schools
The Philipsburg-Osceola School District is the school district that serves the Philipsburg and Osceola Mills area:
 Philipsburg Elementary
 Philipsburg-Osceola Area Middle School
 Philipsburg-Osceola Area Senior High School
 Osceola Mills Elementary

Notable people
 Matt Adams, professional baseball player - Colorado Rockies, also played for St. Louis Cardinals, Atlanta Braves, and Washington Nationals. 2019 World Series Champion with Nationals
 Michael L. Hess, physician - cardiologist
 Jon Condo, professional football player - Oakland Raiders
 Ty Tyson, sportscaster - Detroit Tigers
 David Wilkerson, minister, Teen Challenge

References

External links

 
 Philipsburg Online, area business directory

1864 establishments in Pennsylvania
Boroughs in Centre County, Pennsylvania
Populated places established in 1797
Populated places on the Underground Railroad